Andorf is a municipality in the district of Schärding in Upper Austria, Austria. As of 2008, it had a population of 5,023.

Geography
Andorf is divided into the 7 cadastral subdivisions: Andorf, Burgerding, Heitzing, Kurzenkirchen, Oberndorf, Schulleredt and Teuflau.

The 56 localities which belong to the municipality are Andorf, An der Fernstraße, Autzing, Bach, Basling, Breitenberg, Bruck, Burgerding, Eberleinsedt, Edt bei Heitzing, Edt beim Pfarrhof, Erlau, Gerolding, Getzing, Großpichl, Großschörgern, Haula, Hebertspram, Heitzing, Heitzingerau, Hier, Hof, Hörzberg, Hötzlarn, Hötzenedt, Humerleiten, Hutstock, Kleinpichl, Kleinschörgern, Kreilern, Kurzenkirchen, Laab, Lauterbrunn, Lichtegg, Linden, Lohstampf, Matzing, Mayrhof, Niederhartwagen, Niederleiten, Oberndorf, Pimpfing, Pram, Pranzen, Rablern, Radlern, Seifriedsedt, Sonnleiten, Schärdingerau, Schießedt, Schulleredt, Teuflau, Untergriesbach, Winertsham, Winertshamerau and Winteraigen.

History
After the formation of the Dukedom of Bavaria the locality belonged to Bavaria until 1780 . As a result of the Treaty of Teschen, Austria received Innviertel and thus Andorf. During the Napoleonic Wars it again became part of Bavaria. Since 1814 it has been part of Upper Austria. After the incorporation of Austria into Greater Germany by Nazi Germany on 13 March 1938, the locality belonged to "Gau Oberdonau". After 1945, Upper Austria was restored.

Mayor 
Since 2003: Peter Pichler (SPÖ)

Personalities 
 Franz Xaver Gerl (1764-1827), Mozart friend and Mozart singer

References

Literature
Andorf Johnson is a fictitious character in the Sci-Fi novels written by novelist Gary McConville. He is central character in the Winds trilogies entitled:

A Stiff Wind Blows

Winds Of Darkness

Winds Of The Goshi

External links

 Andorf 

Cities and towns in Schärding District